Dingzhou East railway station is a railway station on the Beijing–Guangzhou–Shenzhen–Hong Kong high-speed railway in Dingzhou, Hebei. It opened with the Beijing-Zhengzhou section of the railway on 26 December 2012.

References

Railway stations in Hebei
Railway stations in China opened in 2012